Torus-based cryptography involves using algebraic tori to construct a group for use in ciphers based on the discrete logarithm problem.  This idea was first introduced by Alice Silverberg and Karl Rubin in 2003 in the form of a public key algorithm by the name of CEILIDH. It improves on conventional cryptosystems by representing some elements of large finite fields compactly and therefore transmitting fewer bits.

See also

 Torus

References
 Karl Rubin, Alice Silverberg: Torus-Based Cryptography. CRYPTO 2003: 349–365

External links
 Torus-Based Cryptography — the paper introducing the concept (in PDF).

Public-key cryptography